Friedrich August Bouterwek (or Buterweck) was  a German artist, who spent much of his life in Paris.

Life
Bouterwek was born at Tarnowitz, in Silesia, in 1806. He was trained in the school of Kolbe at Berlin, and later pursued his studies under Delaroche in Paris, where he three times carried off the gold medal. In 1834 he made a tour in Italy, and later visited Spain, Scotland, and the East. After a while he moved from Berlin to Paris, where he lived for 25 years. In the course of his life he was awarded 23 medals and numerous orders. He died in Paris in 1867.

Works
His works include:

Orestes pursued by the Furies (1833).
Borneo taking leave of Juliet(1836).
Isaac and Rebekah (1840).
Episode from Gamacho's Wedding.
Jacob and Eacbel(1844).
Baptism of the Ethiopian Eunuch (1848).
Bridal feast of Daphnis and Chloe (1855).

See also
 List of German painters

References

Sources
 

19th-century German painters
19th-century German male artists
German male painters
People from Tarnowskie Góry
1806 births
1867 deaths
People from the Province of Silesia